Scopula lathraea is a moth of the  family Geometridae. It is found in Malawi.

References

Endemic fauna of Malawi
Moths described in 1922
lathraea
Lepidoptera of Malawi
Moths of Sub-Saharan Africa